K. J. Baby (born 27 February 1954) is an Indian writer and film director from the Kerala state.

Life

Baby's literary works include Nadugaddika, Mavelimantam and Bespurkana. Mavelimantam won the Kerala Sahitya Akademi Award in 1994. Baby and his wife Shirly founded Kanavu, an alternative school/commune for Wayanad's Adivasi children. He directed the film Guda (The Cage, 2003) which told the story of Kattunayakar tribe.

Goodbye Malabar, the latest novel written by  K.J. Baby, was released  on 16th Novembetr, 2019. K.J. Baby won the Bharat Bhavan award for the overall contribution and playwriting in the village drama 'Nadugaddika'.

References

1954 births
Living people
Film directors from Kerala
People from Wayanad district
21st-century Indian film directors
Novelists from Kerala
Malayalam novelists
Malayalam film directors
Recipients of the Kerala Sahitya Akademi Award
20th-century Indian novelists
20th-century Indian male writers